Gerry Building is a high-rise building in the Fashion District of Los Angeles.  Built in 1947, the Streamline Moderne style building was added to the National Register of Historic Places in 2003.

It is located in the Fashion District and originally was used for garment manufacture.

It is a nine-story concrete building "dominated by eight curved tiers of windows. The curving motif
is repeated in the main entrance and showcase windows of the ground level."

References

External links
 Gerry Building Website
 showrooms
showroom at www.gerrybuildingshowrooms.com

Office buildings in Los Angeles
Buildings and structures in Downtown Los Angeles
Manufacturing plants in the United States
Los Angeles Historic-Cultural Monuments
Commercial buildings on the National Register of Historic Places in Los Angeles
Office buildings completed in 1947
1947 establishments in California
1940s architecture in the United States
Streamline Moderne architecture in California